This Is Boston, Not L.A. is a hardcore punk compilation released in 1982. It is considered the definitive album from the Boston hardcore scene, as several of its most prominent bands appear on the record, namely, Jerry's Kids, the Proletariat, the Groinoids, the F.U.'s, Gang Green, Decadence, and the Freeze. For them, with the exception of the later, This Is Boston, Not L.A. was also their debut release. Al Barile's band, SSD, were asked to contribute, but they refused to participate.

The album was named after its closing track, the eponymous song by the Freeze:

According to Clif Hanger, vocalist for the Freeze, the title song was written not to insult Los Angeles scene, but to encourage other Boston acts to find their own unique, local sound rather than emulate other bands from other areas. However, Boston audiences often took away a different meaning. They assumed the song asserted Boston's superiority to Los Angeles.

The album's front cover features a black-and-white image of a mosh pit, taken by Bostonian punk photographer Phil In Phlash.

This Is Boston, Not L.A. would be followed up a few months later by a six-song complementary record, the Unsafe at Any Speed EP.

Release
Consisting of only previously unreleased material, This Is Boston, Not L.A. was originally released in May 1982, as LP and Compact Cassette, on Modern Method Records. A second vinyl pressing of the album would be released later that same year.

Critical reception
In his review for AllMusic, Alex Henderson said:

Unsafe at Any Speed EP

A few months after releasing This Is Boston, Not L.A., Modern Method issued a follow-up companion record, the 7-inch EP titled Unsafe at Any Speed, featuring one unreleased song apiece from six of the bands which had appeared on the original compilation.

Also featuring a Phil In Phlash's photograph of a mosh pit, and bold typography, the record's front cover is of a similar design to that on the original album.

The tracks that make up the EP resurfaced in 1995 as the last six songs on the CD re-release of This Is Boston, Not L.A.

Track listing

Influence
After the record's release, Boston natives took to mocking the title with T-shirts that proclaimed in large type: "This is L.A. (Lower Allston), not Boston" in reference to Allston, Massachusetts.  In the early to mid-1980s, the T-shirt appropriately mimicked the NBA rivalry between the Boston Celtics and Los Angeles Lakers.

The Boston-based ska-punk band Big D and the Kids Table printed T-shirts referencing the song and compilation. They featured "L.A" with a strike through it on the front and "This is Boston Not L.A." on the back. South shore pop-punk band A Loss for Words also made shirts that featured a modified version of the Celtics logo and the same saying on the reverse side. This alludes to both the compilation and the Celtics' victory in the 1984 NBA Finals.

In 1994 Zafio Records released the This is Berkeley Not West Bay 4-way split EP with Black Fork, Dead and Gone, Screw 32 and AFI on it. As a response, in 2000 the Amsterdam-based Kangaroo Records label released the compilation EP This is Kangaroo Not Berkely, with 12 bands from different countries playing 'straight forward hardcore. Like the way it SHOULD be.'

The compilation was mentioned by the punk rock band NOFX on their song "We Got Two Jealous Agains", featured on their album The War on Errorism, released in 2003. A verse of the lyrics reads: "But when I saw Christ on Parade, and This is Boston, Not LA, I knew you were the one".

In 2012, appeared an unlabeled self-released EP titled This Is Boston and S.J., displaying on its cover art the same photograph and graphic style of the 1982 LP, but instead of it saying "Not L.A.", it's crossed off and says "and S.J.". Hostage and Swamps from Massachusetts share the record with Bad Times Crew, and True Hearted from San Jose, California.

Reissues
In October 1995, This Is Boston, Not L.A. was re-released as a remastered CD on Newbury Comics' in-house record label Wicked Disc, a short-lived follow-up to the demised Modern Method Records. This edition included, as bonus tracks, the entire Unsafe at Any Speed EP.

On July 29, 2016, Newbury Comics re-released the album as a limited repressing of 1,500 copies on colored vinyl, in four different design variations.

Track listings
In the original LP from 1982, "Straight Jacket" is spelled "Strait Jacket" on the side A disc label and on the inner sleeve, while "I Don't Know" appears as "I Don't Care" on the back cover and on the side B disc label, and "This Is Boston, Not L.A." is shortened to "Boston not L.A." on the back cover and on the side B disc label. In the Compact Cassette version, also from 1982, "I Don't Know" appears as "I Don't Care", and "This Is Boston, Not L.A." is shortened to "Boston not L.A."

1982 LP and MC release

1995 remastered CD edition
Track 36 hides an untitled looped version of the final line of the title song: "This is Boston" is heard once, "fuck L.A." is the loop.

Personnel

Jerry's Kids
Bryan Jones – vocals
Bob Cenci – guitar
Dave Aronson – guitar
Rick Jones – bass
Brian Betzger – drums
The Proletariat
Richard Brown – vocals
Frank Michaels – guitar
Peter Bevilacqua – bass, backing vocals
Tom McKnight – drums
Groinoids
Mongoloid – vocals
Rico Petroleum – guitar
Fetuchini (aka Cheesely) – bass
Red-Squirts (aka Big Daddy) – drums, horn
The F.U.'s
John Sox – vocals
Steve Grimes – guitar, vocals
Joe Rockhead – bass
Bob Furapples – drums
The John Wayne Memorial "Lick-the-Big-C" Boys' Choir – choir in "Green Beret"
Gang Green
Chris Doherty – guitar, vocals
Bill Manley – bass, vocals
Mike Dean – drums
Decadence
Eric Wilkinson – vocals
Glenn Norton – guitar
Jon Anastas – bass
Wright Manley – drums

The Freeze
Clif "Hanger" Croce – vocals
Rob DeCradle – guitar
Rick Andrews – bass
Lou Cataldo – drums

Production
Michel Bastarache (pka Mr. B) – production (tracks A1 to A6, B1 to B7)
Jimmy Dufour – production (A7, A8), co-production (A9, A11 to A14), engineering (A1 to A10, B1 to B7)
The Freeze – production (B9 to B16)
Lou Giordano – co-production (A9), engineering (A1 to A6, A11 to A14, B1 to B7)
Frank Michaels – co-production (A9)
Jay Snow – co-production (A10)
Groinoids – co-production (A10)
The F.U.'s – co-production (A11 to A14)
Nasty – co-production (B8)
Grub the Great – co-production (B8)
Emir Galevi – engineering (B9)
Ken Kanavous – engineering (B10 to B16)
Phil In Phlash – photography
Additional production (1995 remastered CD edition)
Mark McKay – editing
Sean Sweeney – editing
Henk Kooistra – remastering
Joe Cuneo – remastering (assistance)
Michel Bastarache (pka Mr. B) – technical assistance, illustration (flyers), liner notes
Rachel Kieserman – illustration (assistance)
Jack Kelly – illustration (flyers)
Mike Gitter (from xXx Fanzine) – liner notes

Notes

References

Further reading
 Blush, Steven (2001). "Boston Not L.A.: The Kids Will Have Their Say". American Hardcore: A Tribal History. Second ed., 2010. Port Townsend: Feral House. . pp. 177–191.
 Hurchalla, George (Zuo Press, 2005). "Bend My Ear, Twist My Arm". Going Underground: American Punk 1979–1989. Second ed., 2016. Oakland: PM Press. . pp. 197–214.
 Quint, Al (September 1982). "Various Artists: Unsafe at Any Speed (Modern Method)". Suburban Punk (1).

External links
 Henderson, Alex. "This Is Boston, Not L.A.: AllMusic Review by Alex Henderson". AllMusic.
 Erich (July 15, 2008). "V/A Unsafe at Any Speed- Compilation 7″EP (Modern Method Records, USA, 1982)". Good Bad Music for Bad, Bad Times!

1982 compilation albums
Songs about Boston
20th century in Boston
Hardcore punk compilation albums
Regional music compilation albums